José Luis Delgadillo Pulido (born April 23, 1991) is a Mexican football striker who plays for Lobos de la BUAP on loan from Atlas.

Club career

Club Atlas 

Luis Delgadillo formed part of the youth teams of Club Atlas and played in the team of Segunda Division de Mexico.

HNK Rijeka

Delgadillo was transferred on loan to HNK Rijeka on 5 July 2011. In that transfer his teammate Carlos Gutiérrez, was transferred too, from the Club Atlas.

Both clubs signed an agreement where both institutions made an exchange of players, as well as working structure of basic forces.

With the agreement signed, Robert Komen chairman of HNK Rijeka presented to Luis Delgadillo as the first hire of the Rijeka to the 2011–12 Prva HNL season with his teammate Gutiérrez.

Career statistics

Club

References

External links 
 
 

1991 births
Living people
People from Ciudad Guzmán, Jalisco
Footballers from Jalisco
Mexican expatriate footballers
Association football forwards
HNK Rijeka players
Lobos BUAP footballers
Expatriate footballers in Croatia
Mexican expatriate sportspeople in Croatia
Croatian Football League players
Mexican footballers